"Ride!" is a song written by Kal Mann and Dave Appell and performed by Dee Dee Sharp.   It was featured on the 1963 album All the Hits (Volume II).
The single sold over one million copies and was awarded a gold disc.

Background
The song begins with Dee Dee Sharp yelling : "Let's Pony Again".  The male backup singers repeatedly sing the words: "Get It". This song was meant to rejuvenate Chubby Checker's dance hit song from the previous year "Pony Time"(1961).

Chart performance
"Ride!" reached No. 5 on the Billboard Hot 100 and No. 7 on the U.S. R&B chart in 1962.

Other versions
The Orlons released a version of the song on their 1963 album All the Hits by The Orlons.

References

1962 songs
1962 singles
Songs with lyrics by Kal Mann
Songs written by Dave Appell
Dee Dee Sharp songs
Cameo Records singles